Syed Ijaz Hussain (born 7 April 1942) is a Pakistani former cricketer who played first-class cricket in Pakistan from 1957 to 1976. He represented Pakistan in the 1960s but did not play Test cricket.

Hussain was a wicketkeeper-batsman who usually opened the innings. His highest score was 173 in an innings victory for Railways Reds over Lahore Reds in 1965-66. 

He played two matches for Pakistan against the touring Ceylon team in 1966-67, and all three matches for Pakistan Under-25 against MCC Under-25 later that season. He also played for Pakistan against The Rest (of Pakistan) in 1969-70.

References

External links

1942 births
Living people
Pakistani cricketers
Cricketers from Bahawalpur
Bahawalpur cricketers
Multan cricketers
Pakistan Railways cricketers
National Bank of Pakistan cricketers 
Public Works Department cricketers